Villanova Wildcats Swimming and Diving  is Villanova University's varsity swimming and diving team. The Wildcats compete in the NCAA's Big East Conference. Currently the Wildcats are coached by Rick Simpson, assisted by Laura McGlaughlin, Nathan Brown, and Conor Hasard. Todd Michael is the team's diving coach.

Conference achievements

Notable alumni

 2000 Olympian for the United States, Maddy Crippen
 2008 Olympian for Puerto Rico, Kristina Lennox-Silva

References

 
College swim teams in the United States
Villanova Wildcats